The Hayseeds' Melbourne Cup is a 1918 Australian rural comedy from director Beaumont Smith. It was the fourth in his series about the rural family, the Hayseeds, and centers on Dad Hayseed entering his horse in the Melbourne Cup.

It is considered a lost film.

Synopsis
Dad Hayseed buys a horse for £20 called Cornstalk and it starts winning so many local races he decides to enter it in the Melbourne Cup. He is accompanied by his son Jim (the trainer), cousin Harold (jockey) and Mum Hayseed. Jim falls in love with an actress, and Mum has a nightmare about washing steps of Parliament House. On the race day, Mum boils a billy at Flemington and Cornstalk wins the race despite the efforts of a crooked bookmaker.

Cast
Fred MacDonald as Jim Hayseed
Tal Ordell as Dad Hayseed
Harry McDonna as Cousin Harold
Gladys Leigh as Mrs Hayseed
Guy Hastings
Ethel Grist
Mattie Ive
Jessie Dale
Driscoll

Production
Each of the first four Hayseeds movies had been filmed in a different state to maximise box-office appeal. This one was shot in Melbourne Victoria in November 1917. It included footage from the real 1917 Melbourne Cup Carnival, as well as Parliament House, Flinders Street Station, Collins Street, Bourke Street, and the stables belonging to famous horse trainer James Scobie.

It was followed by Townies and Hayseeds.

References

External links
The Hayseeds' Melbourne Cup in the Internet Movie Database
The Hayseeds Melbourne Cup at National Film and Sound Archive

1918 films
Films directed by Beaumont Smith
Lost Australian films
Australian silent feature films
Australian black-and-white films
Australian comedy films
1918 comedy films
1918 lost films
Lost comedy films
Silent comedy films